This page lists the World Best Year Performance in the year 2006 for the men's decathlon. The main event during this season was the 2006 European Championships in Gothenburg, Sweden. The competition started on 10 August and ended on 11 August. The main stadium for this 19th championship was the Stadium Ullevi.

Records

2006 World Year Ranking

See also
2006 Décastar
2006 Hypo-Meeting

References
decathlon2000
IAAF
apulanta

2006
Decathlon Year Ranking, 2006